Pennsylvania Route 29 (PA 29) is a  north–south state highway that runs through most of eastern Pennsylvania. 

The route currently exists in two segments, a southern segment and a northern segment. The southern segment runs from U.S. Route 30 (US 30) near Malvern north to Interstate 78 (I-78)/PA 309 near Allentown. The northern segment runs from I-81 in Ashley north to the New York state line near Brookdale, Pennsylvania, where the road becomes New York State Route 7 (NY 7).  The southernmost  of PA 29's northern segment is a freeway known as the South Cross Valley Expressway. The route was continuous until May 9, 1966 when PA 29 was split into the two segments that exist today.

Route description

Southern section

Chester County

The southern section of PA 29 begins at an intersection with US 30 near the borough of Malvern in East Whiteland Township, Chester County, heading north on six-lane divided South Morehall Road. The road passes businesses and office parks, curving northwest and crossing the Chester Valley Trail before coming to an interchange with the US 202 freeway. The route passes to the west of the Penn State Great Valley university campus at the Swedesford Road intersection and then becomes North Morehall Road, narrowing to four lanes and heading to the west of Great Valley Corporate Center. PA 29 runs through wooded areas, crossing Valley Creek before curving north and passing through more of the Great Valley Corporate Center. The road runs between a quarry to the west and a lake and residential development to the east before it comes to a ramp providing access to the Pennsylvania Turnpike (I-76). Past here, the route becomes undivided near more commercial development, crossing into Charlestown Township and then curving northwest and passing under the Pennsylvania Turnpike and an abandoned railroad line before entering Devault.

At this point, PA 29 turns north onto two-lane undivided State Road and runs through wooded areas with the abandoned railroad parallel to the east. The road curves northwest and passes to the west of a quarry before continuing through forests. The route turns north and passes through the community of Aldham before it makes a curve to the northeast and crosses the Pickering Creek. PA 29 passes under the abandoned railroad line and enters Schuylkill Township, heading through a mix of woods and fields with some homes parallel to the creek. The road turns east and then northeast, heading away from the Pickering Creek and continuing into suburban residential development. The route becomes the border between the borough of Phoenixville to the northwest and Schuylkill Township to the southeast before fully entering Phoenixville as Main Street, passing homes. PA 29 heads to the east of Phoenixville Hospital before it comes to an intersection with PA 23, at which point Main Street splits to the north and PA 29 continues northeast along Manavon Street. The route continues through residential areas, turning north onto Starr Street. PA 29 heads north into the commercial downtown of Phoenixville, where it turns east onto Bridge Street. The route continues east and is joined by the Schuylkill River Trail from the west, passing under Norfolk Southern's Harrisburg Line north of the former Phoenixville station before it comes to the Mont Clare Bridge over the Schuylkill River.

Montgomery County

Upon crossing the Schuylkill River, PA 29 enters Upper Providence Township in Montgomery County and heads northeast as Phoenixville-Collegeville Road, crossing the Schuylkill River Trail, which splits to the east, and heading into the community of Mont Clare. The road runs past a mix of homes and businesses, passing under an abandoned railroad line. The route continues through residential areas before heading into a mix of fields and woods with some homes. PA 29 passes southeast of a golf course and becomes South Collegeville Road, passing near business parks and widening to four lanes. The road becomes a divided highway and comes to an interchange with the US 422 freeway. Past this interchange, the route becomes a six-lane divided highway and runs between the Providence Town Center shopping center to the northwest and office parks to the southeast. PA 29 narrows to a two-lane undivided road and passes to the southeast of residential development, heading through the community of Yerkes. The road runs through wooded areas before it heads near businesses and enters the borough of Collegeville, where it gains a second northbound lane and becomes 2nd Avenue. The route curves east and crosses the Perkiomen Trail before heading past a shopping center to the north and homes to the south. The road narrows to two lanes and turns north, heading past more businesses and widening to a four-lane divided highway as it comes to an intersection with East Main Street. Here, PA 29 crosses East Main Street and curves northeast before it heads north along two-lane undivided 1st Avenue, running along the west bank of the Perkiomen Creek. The road runs near some commercial development before it continues through wooded areas between the Perkiomen Trail to the west and the creek to the east, crossing the trail again.

The route leaves Collegeville for Perkiomen Township and becomes Gravel Pike, running through wooded areas with some residential development to the west of the Perkiomen Trail and the Perkiomen Creek. In the community of Rahns, PA 29 comes to an intersection with PA 113. Past this junction, the road runs through more woodland with some residential and commercial development west of the creek, passing east of Perkiomen Valley High School and heading through the community of Graterford. The route continues north alongside the Perkiomen Creek and bends northwest, coming to an intersection with PA 73. At this point, PA 29 begins a concurrency with PA 73 and the two routes head into the borough of Schwenskville on Main Street, heading past homes and businesses and curving to the north. Farther north, the road becomes the border between Schwenksville to the west and Lower Frederick Township to the east, running between wooded neighborhoods to the west and the Perkiomen Creek and Perkiomen Trail to the east. The two routes cross Swamp Creek to fully enter Lower Frederick Township and become Gravel Pike, running through wooded areas with some homes. In the community of Zieglerville, PA 73 splits from PA 29 at a roundabout by heading west.

From here, PA 29 continues north along Gravel Pike through a mix of farmland and woodland with a few homes and businesses. Farther north, the road enters Upper Frederick Township and runs through wooded areas with some fields and homes. The route curves northeast and crosses the Perkiomen Creek into Marlborough Township, where it passes through the residential community of Perkiomenville and crosses the Perkiomen Trail again. PA 29 curves northwest and heads through forests along the east bank of the creek. The road makes a turn to the east and passes to the south of Knight Lake within Upper Perkiomen Valley County Park, heading into the borough of Green Lane. Here, the route turns north and runs past a mix of homes and businesses, coming to an intersection with the western terminus of PA 63. Past this intersection, PA 29 bends to the northwest past more development before it turns west and runs through wooded areas on the border between Marlborough Township to the north and Green Lane to the south. The road turns north and fully enters Marlborough Township, heading through wooded areas with some homes to the east of Green Lane Reservoir Park.

The route heads into a mix of farmland and woodland with some homes and enters Upper Hanover Township. Farther north, PA 29 crosses into the borough of Red Hill and becomes Main Street, lined with homes. The road continues past residences with a few businesses and bends to the north-northwest. The route enters the borough of Pennsburg and runs past more homes and commercial development. PA 29 reaches the commercial center of Pennsburg, where it comes to an intersection with PA 663. Past this intersection, the road runs past homes and a few businesses, continuing into the borough of East Greenville. In this borough, the route continues through residential areas. PA 29 leaves East Greenville for Upper Hanover Township and becomes Gravel Pike, passing between a shopping center to the southwest and farmland to the northeast. The road continues northwest through a mix of farm fields and residences, with industrial areas to the southwest. The route heads into forested areas with some development and passes under an East Penn Railroad line. PA 29 runs to the north of Perkiomen Creek before it runs past homes and a few businesses in the community of Palm. The road continues northwest into farmland with some homes.

Berks and Lehigh counties

PA 29 enters Hereford Township in Berks County and runs past homes with some farms and woods in the community of Chapel, curving to the north. The road runs through agricultural areas with some development and turns northwest, coming to an intersection with PA 100 in the community of Hereford. At this point, PA 29 turns north for a concurrency with PA 100 on Chestnut Street, and the two routes head north into woodland with some fields and residences. PA 29/PA 100 crosses into Upper Milford Township in Lehigh County, which is in the Lehigh Valley, curving northeast through wooded areas with some farmland and development in the South Mountain range. The road turns north near the community of Old Zionsville before it passes through the residential community of Shimerville. PA 100 splits from PA 29 by turning northwest onto North Kings Highway, with PA 100 Truck heading north along PA 29.

Past PA 100, PA 29/PA 100 Truck continue along Chestnut Street through wooded areas with some residential and commercial development. The road curves northeast and heads near homes, with PA 100 Truck splitting to the west to follow Buckeye Road. PA 29 continues past commercial development before it comes to a bridge over Norfolk Southern's Reading Line and curves to the east-northeast near homes and businesses. The road passes under the Pennsylvania Turnpike Northeast Extension (I-476) and heads into the borough of Emmaus, where it is lined with businesses. PA 29 turns northwest onto Cedar Crest Boulevard and  passes through residential areas to the southwest of Emmaus High School, heading through a section of Upper Milford Township before becoming the border between Lower Macungie Township to the west and Emmaus to the east and curving to the north. The road fully enters Lower Macungie Township and crosses Little Lehigh Creek, passing through a mix of fields, woods, and homes and running to the west of Lehigh Country Club. PA 29 crosses into Salisbury Township and widens into a four-lane road that passes between Lehigh Valley Hospital–Cedar Crest to the west and an office park to the east. The route becomes a divided highway and comes to an interchange with I-78/PA 309, where the southern section of PA 29 ends and Cedar Crest Boulevard becomes SR 1019, continuing north toward the city of Allentown.

Northern section

Luzerne County

The northern section of PA 29 begins at a trumpet interchange with I-81 south of the borough of Ashley in Hanover Township, Luzerne County, heading west on the South Cross Valley Expressway, a four-lane freeway. The route passes through wooded areas with some nearby development, coming to an interchange with Main Street that provides access to Ashley to the northeast and the borough of Sugar Notch to the southwest. Following this interchange, the freeway heads through a corner of Sugar Notch before crossing back into Hanover Township and passing near several warehouses and some homes. PA 29 reaches a diamond interchange with South Main Street that serves the city of Wilkes-Barre to the northeast and the community of Alden to the southwest. The route bends west-southwest into wooded areas, curving to the northeast as it heads east of the city of Nanticoke. The freeway comes to an interchange with Sans Souci Parkway, which heads west to Nanticoke and northeast to Wilkes-Barre. Following this, PA 29 passes over Norfolk Southern's Sunbury Line before it comes to a bridge over the Susquehanna River, at which point it crosses into Plymouth Township. Here, the route comes to the end of the South Cross Valley Expressway at a trumpet interchange with a two-way road carrying the northbound direction of US 11; the southbound direction of US 11 bypasses the interchange to the north.

At this point, PA 29 heads west concurrent with the northbound direction of US 11 on a divided highway with one northbound lane and two southbound lanes, heading through wooded areas to the north of the Susquehanna River. The southbound direction of US 11 merges in and US 11/PA 29 continue west as two-lane undivided East Poplar Street through woods before heading past homes and businesses in the community of West Nanticoke, gaining a center left-turn lane. The name changes to Allen Street before the roadway curves northwest. The road crosses Harveys Creek before PA 29 splits from US 11 by turning north-northeast onto two-lane South Mill Street, running past more development to the west of the creek. The route becomes North Mill Street before it leaves West Nanticoke and becomes an unnamed road, winding northeast through a section of the Pinchot State Forest, alongside Harveys Creek and between Shickshinny Mountain to the west and Larksville Mountain to the east. The road crosses to the east side of the creek and winds north through more forest, crossing into Jackson Township. At this point, the route enters the Back Mountain region of Luzerne County. PA 29 curves to the northwest and leaves the state forest, passing through the community of Ceasetown and heading west through more forested land. The road crosses Harveys Creek and heads to the south of Pikes Creek Reservoir, where it passes through a small corner of Plymouth Township before entering Lehman Township. The route continues through wooded areas with some homes before it curves northwest and runs through the wooded residential community of Silkworth, where it passes southwest of Lake Silkworth. PA 29 turns to the north and runs through more forests with some fields and comes, crossing into Lake Township and coming to an intersection with PA 118 in the community of Pikes Creek. Past this intersection, the road runs through more woodland with some fields and homes, turning to the west. The route makes a sharp curve to the north and runs through more rural land with some development, winding to the northeast and passing through the community of Ruggles as it runs to the southeast of North Mountain.

Wyoming County

PA 29 enters Noxen Township in Wyoming County and continues northeast through a mix of fields and woods with some homes, coming to an intersection with the northern terminus of PA 415 in the community of Ruggles Corners. Here, the route turns northwest and runs through forests with some homes, curving to the north. The road bends northeast and then east, heading into the residential community of Noxen. Here, PA 29 curves north and turns east, continuing past homes. The route crosses Bowman Creek and heads into farmland with some homes, entering Monroe Township and bending to the northeast. The road passes over the creek again and continues to the community of Bowman Creek, where it curves north and reaches an intersection with the northern terminus of PA 309. At this point, PA 29 heads northwest and crosses Bowman Creek, running through forested areas with a few homes to the west of the creek. The route curves northeast and continues alongside Bowman Creek, passing through the community of Evans Falls. The road runs through forests with some fields and homes, reaching a junction with the western terminus of PA 292. Following this, PA 29 enters Eaton Township and continues through rural land, turning north and briefly becoming a four-lane divided highway. The route becomes a two-lane undivided road again and crosses Bowman Creek on a truss bridge, coming to a rest area accessible from both directions on the southbound side of the road. The road continues north-northeast through a mix of farms and woods east of the creek, passing through the community of Rosengrant and turning to the northeast. PA 29 crosses Bowman Creek again and continues through rural areas with some development, turning to the north. The route gains a center left-turn lane and becomes Hunter Highway, passing businesses as it heads to the west of Skyhaven Airport. Farther north, the road loses the center turn lane.

PA 29 crosses the Susquehanna River into the borough of Tunkhannock and becomes Bridge Street, crossing the Reading Blue Mountain and Northern Railroad's Susquehanna Branch line and coming to an intersection with US 6. From here, the route runs past businesses and reaches a junction with US 6 Bus. in the commercial downtown of Tunkhannock. The road continues north-northeast through residential areas with a few businesses. PA 29 leaves Tunkhannock for Tunkhannock Township and becomes an unnamed road, heading north through a mix of farmland and woodland with some residences and commercial development. The road continues through wooded areas with some fields and homes, passing to the west of the community of Lake Carey and heading into Lemon Township. The route heads to the east of Stevens Lake and runs through farms and woods, passing through the community of Lemon. The road passes through more rural land and crosses Meshoppen Creek before running to the west of the community of Avery.

Susquehanna County

PA 29 continues into Springville Township in Susquehanna County and heads north-northeast through a mix of farmland and woodland with some homes, passing through the community of Springville. The road continues through rural land with some natural gas wells and crosses into Dimock Township, passing through the community of Tyler. The route runs through farmland with some woods, homes, and natural gas wells and turns to the north, heading through the community of Dimock. PA 29 runs through a mix of fields and woods with some development, entering Bridgewater Township. The road passes to the west of Husky Haven Airport and runs past homes and businesses in the community of South Montrose. The route continues north-northeast through rural areas before it bends northeast and then northwest as it runs through woodland with some nearby homes. PA 29 enters the borough of Montrose and becomes South Main Street, running through residential areas. The route curves northeast and runs past businesses before reaching an intersection with PA 167/PA 706 in the downtown area of Montrose. Here, PA 29 turns southeast to join PA 167/PA 706 on Church Street. The road passes more homes, turning northeast and becoming Grow Avenue. The three routes head into commercial areas and crosses back into Bridgewater Township, becoming an unnamed road.

PA 29 splits from PA 167/PA 706 by heading north on an unnamed road, passing to the west of Lake Montrose. The road continues through a mix of farmland and woodland with some homes, crossing into Franklin Township and bending to the north-northeast. The route winds north through more rural areas and becomes parallel to Snake Creek, which is to the east of the road. PA 29 runs through wooded areas with some fields and residences, passing through the community of Franklin Forks. The road continues north and enters Liberty Township, where it becomes Snake Creek Road and bends north-northeast, running through the community of Lawsville Center. The route runs through forests with some farm fields and residences to the west of Snake Creek and heads through the community of Brookdale. The northern section of PA 29 reaches its northern terminus at the New York state line, where the road continues into that state as NY 7.

History

Original route

PA 29 was created and first signed in 1928. During this time, construction began on the segment between Tunkhannock north to Springville. A year later, the stretch between Tunkhannock and Lemon, midway Tunkhannock and Springville, opened to traffic. Lemon to Springville opened the following year, in 1930.

In 1934, work started on the section between US 6 in Tunkhannock and Franklin Forks, located midway between Montrose and the state border. The construction was complete by the following year. In 1936, two major sections of the route, stretching between Evans Falls to Rosengrants, near Tunkhannock, and from Franklin Forks to the state line, were paved. A subsequent project united PA 29 into a single route, completing the road from Hazleton to Tunkhannock. PA 29 and PA 113 switched alignments between Phoenixville and Rahns in 1937, with PA 29 now following its present alignment between those two places.

Two years later, the section from Rosengrants to Tunkhannock was paved. In 1940, the section between Bowmans Creek and Evans Falls was paved.

The first realignment of the route came in 1946 when PA 29 was routed to its current position between West Nanticoke and Silkworth, shifting the route from Cragle Hill Road and Swamp Road to US 11 from Shickshinny to West Nanticoke. This routing replaced Pennsylvania Route 139.

The route was split on May 9, 1966, by eliminating the section between US 309 in Allentown and US 11 in West Nanticoke, removing a number of overlaps that linked the two segments. The former alignment of PA 29 became solely US 309 (now PA 309) between Allentown and Schnecksville, newly-designated PA 873 between Schnecksville and Lehigh Gap, newly-designated PA 248 between Lehigh Gap and Weissport, solely US 209 between Weissport and Nesquehoning, an extension of PA 93 between Nesquehoning and Nescopeck, an extension of PA 239 between Nescopeck and Shickshinny, and solely US 11 between Shickshinny and West Nanticoke.

Post-split

In 1969, construction began on the South Cross Valley Expressway between Sugar Notch and the Nanticoke interchange. The expressway was extended to I-81 in 1971 and opened in 1972.

Prior to construction of the US 202 expressway in 1970, PA 29 travelled entirely on Phoenixville Pike between Phoenixville and West Chester.  PA 29 entered West Chester on Goshen Road and Marshall Street ending at PA 100 (High Street) in town.  When the US 202 expressway was built, PA 29 was rerouted onto Morehall Road at Devault and ran south to junction US 202 and then end at US 30.

In 1978, PA 29 was re-signed to the northern segment of the route after 12 years of not having a designation. The southern terminus was moved from West Nanticoke to the current end at I-81 exit 164 in Ashley.

There are future plans to extend the South Cross Valley Expressway in 2009.

In 2009, a roundabout was constructed at the intersection of PA 29 and PA 73 in Lower Frederick Township; crashes decreased at this junction after the roundabout opened.

On December 11, 2012, an E-ZPass-only interchange opened with the Pennsylvania Turnpike.

In November 2020, a portion of PA 29 in Collegeville was realigned to cross Main Steeet from 2nd Avenue to 1st Avenue instead of following Main Street for a block.

Major intersections

PA 29 Truck

Montgomery County

Pennsylvania Route 29 Truck signs are used to direct motorists from Egypt Road at the US 422 interchange to PA 29 in Upper Providence Township in Montgomery County. Trucks are not allowed to make the sharp right turn from westbound Egypt Road to northbound PA 29 and must use Black Rock Road to access PA 29 north. Trucks heading to southbound PA 29 may access it from Egypt Road.

Lehigh County

Pennsylvania Route 29 Truck is a truck route around a weight-restricted bridge over Norfolk Southern's Reading Line in Upper Milford Township in Lehigh County, on which trucks over 30 tons and combination loads over 40 tons are prohibited. The route follows Buckeye Road and Chestnut Street (running concurrent with PA 100 Truck), PA 100, Weilers Road, Hamilton Boulevard, and Lower Macungie Road. It was signed in 2013.

See also

References

External links

Pennsylvania Highways: PA 29 South
Pennsylvania Highways: PA 29 North
Pennsylvania Roads - PA 29

029
Limited-access roads in Pennsylvania
Transportation in Chester County, Pennsylvania
Transportation in Montgomery County, Pennsylvania
Transportation in Berks County, Pennsylvania
Transportation in Lehigh County, Pennsylvania
Transportation in Luzerne County, Pennsylvania
Transportation in Wyoming County, Pennsylvania
Transportation in Susquehanna County, Pennsylvania